Shar Ink, (also known as Shar-Avia and Ball Inc. Ltd.), was a Russian charter cargo airline based in Moscow. In 2009, the company announced that it would be co-operating with a new airline called I-Fly. The airline ceased all operations in 2019.

Fleet

References

External links

  

Defunct airlines of Russia
Airlines established in 1992
Airlines disestablished in 2019
Cargo airlines of Russia
Companies based in Moscow